Quercus braianensis is a tree species in the beech family Fagaceae. There are no known subspecies. It is placed in subgenus Cerris, section Cyclobalanopsis.

The species appears to be endemic to Vietnam, where it may be called sồi Braian; the tree grows up to 28 m.

References

External links

braianensis
Endemic flora of Vietnam
Flora of Indo-China
Trees of Vietnam
Taxa named by Aimée Antoinette Camus